Hugh de Avigo was the Archdeacon of Totnes, Devonshire, England, during 1143.

References

Archdeacons of Totnes